William Baliol Brett, 1st Viscount Esher, PC (13 August 181524 May 1899), known as Sir William Brett between 1868 and 1883, was a British lawyer, judge, and Conservative politician. He was briefly Solicitor-General under Benjamin Disraeli and then served as a justice of the Court of Common Pleas between 1868 and 1876, as a Lord Justice of Appeal between 1876 and 1883 and as Master of the Rolls. He was raised to the peerage as Baron Esher in 1885 and further honoured when he was made Viscount Esher on his retirement in 1897.

Background and education 
Brett was a son of the Reverend Joseph George Brett, of Chelsea, London, by Dorothy, daughter of George Best, of Chilston Park, Boughton Malherbe, Kent. He was educated at Westminster School, King's College London and at Gonville and Caius College, Cambridge. Brett rowed for Cambridge University Boat Club against Leander Club in 1837 and 1838, then in the victorious Cambridge crew against Oxford University in the 1839 Boat Race.

Career 
Called to the Bar in 1840, Brett went to the northern circuit and became a Queen's Counsel in 1861. On the death of Richard Cobden in 1865, he unsuccessfully contested Rochdale as a Conservative, but in an 1866 by-election, he was returned for Helston in unique circumstances. He and his opponent polled exactly the same number of votes, and the mayor, as returning officer, then gave his casting vote for the Liberal candidate. As the vote was given after four o'clock, however, an appeal was lodged, and the House of Commons allowed both members to take their seats.

Brett rapidly made his mark in the House, and in early 1868, he was knighted and appointed Solicitor General under Benjamin Disraeli. On behalf of the Crown, he prosecuted the Fenians charged with having caused the Clerkenwell Outrage. In Parliament, he took a leading part in the promotion of bills connected with the administration of law and justice. In August 1868, he was appointed a Justice of the Court of Common Pleas. Some of his sentences in this capacity excited much criticism, notably so in the case of the gas stokers strike, when he sentenced the defendants to imprisonment for twelve months, with hard labour, which was afterwards reduced by the Home Secretary to four months.

On the reconstitution of the Court of Appeal in 1876, Brett was elevated to the rank of a Lord Justice of Appeal. He was sworn of the Privy Council at the same time. After holding the position for seven years, he succeeded Sir George Jessel as Master of the Rolls in 1883. In 1885 he was raised to the peerage as Baron Esher, of Esher in the County of Surrey. He opposed the bill proposing that an accused person or his wife might give evidence in their own case and supported the bill that empowered Lords of Appeal to sit and vote after their retirement. The Solicitors Act 1888, which increased the powers of the Incorporated Law Society, owed much to his influence. In 1880, he delivered a speech in the House of Lords, deprecating the delay and expense of trials, which he regarded as having been increased by the Judicature Act 1873. He retired from the bench at the close of 1897, and was created Viscount Esher, of Esher in the County of Surrey, a dignity rarely given to any judge, Lord Chancellors excepted.

Judgments
Tamplin v James (1880) 15 Ch D 215 (CA), upholding a decision of Baggallay LJ in the first instance; contract law concerning the availability of specific performance for a breach of contract induced by mistake.
Compagnie Financiere du Pacifique v Peruvian Guano Co (1882) 11 QBD 55 - Established the modern test for discovery of documents. 
Heaven v Pender (1883) - In the obiter dicta in his judgment of the Court of Appeal, Brett MR sought to establish a general "duty of care" between parties that would have led to a tort of negligence. Such a principle was only finally accepted by English courts in 1932.
Foakes v Beer (Brett sitting in the Court of Appeal) [1884] UKHL 1, [1881-85] All ER Rep 106, (1884) 9 App Cas 605; 54 LJQB 130; 51 LT 833; 33 WR 233 - a leading case from the House of Lords on the legal concept of consideration
In the Arbitration between Secretary of State for Home Department and Fletcher (1887) - upholding a Queens bench decision supporting the authority of the Inspector of Mines to require the use of safety lamps; Bowen LJ dissenting.
Filburn v People's Palace and Aquarium Co Ltd (1890) was a case that imposed strict liability upon owners of wild animals for harm caused by them.
British South Africa Co v Companhia de Moçambique [1893] AC 602 (Esher sitting in the Court of Appeal) - Esher dissented from the Court of Appeal decision of Fry LJ and Lopes LJ; the House of Lords overturned their decision and by so doing established the Mozambique rule, a common law rule in private international law that renders actions relating to title in foreign land, the right to possession of foreign land, and trespass to foreign land non-justiciable in common law jurisdictions.
The Satanita [1897] AC 59 - Contract law case atypical of the conventional offer & acceptance pattern seen in English law. Brett's decision at appeal affirmed by the House of Lords.

Family
Lord Esher married Eugénie Mayer (1814–1904) in 1850. She was the daughter of Finette and Lazare Mayer, and the step-daughter of Lt Col John Gurwood, the editor of Wellington's Dispatches.  They had two sons, Reginald, and Eugène, and a daughter Violet, wife of William Humble Dudley Ward and mother of William Dudley Ward. Lord Esher died in London in May 1899, aged eighty-one, and was succeeded by his eldest son, Reginald.

Arms

See also
List of Cambridge University Boat Race crews

References

External links

 

1817 births
1899 deaths
People educated at Westminster School, London
Alumni of Gonville and Caius College, Cambridge
Cambridge University Boat Club rowers
British male rowers
19th-century English judges
Members of the Privy Council of the United Kingdom
UK MPs 1865–1868
UK MPs who were granted peerages
Conservative Party (UK) MPs for English constituencies
Viscounts in the Peerage of the United Kingdom
Solicitors General for England and Wales
Masters of the Rolls
Justices of the Common Pleas
Knights Bachelor
Common Pleas Division judges
Members of the Parliament of the United Kingdom for Helston
Peers of the United Kingdom created by Queen Victoria